Protein Wnt-5a is a protein that in humans is encoded by the WNT5A gene.

Function 

The WNT gene family consists of structurally related genes that encode secreted signaling lipid modified glycoproteins. These proteins have been implicated in oncogenesis and in several developmental processes, including regulation of cell fate and patterning during embryogenesis. This gene is a member of the WNT gene family. The WNT5A is highly expressed in the dermal papilla of depilated skin. It encodes a protein showing 98%, 98%, and 87% amino acid identity to the mouse, rat and the xenopus Wnt5a protein, respectively. Wnts, specifically Wnt5a, have also been positively correlated and implicated in inflammatory diseases such as rheumatoid arthritis, tuberculosis, and atherosclerosis.  A central player and active secretor of Wnt5a in both cancer and these inflammatory diseases are macrophages. Experiments performed in Xenopus laevis embryos have identified that human frizzled-5 (hFz5) is the receptor for the Wnt5a ligand and the Wnt5a/hFz5 signaling mediates axis induction. However, non-canonical Wnt5a has also been shown to bind to Ror1/2, RYK, and RTK depending on cell and receptor context to mediate a variety of functions ranging from cell proliferation, polarity, differentiation and apoptosis.

Development 

The Wnt5a gene is also a key component in posterior development of the female reproductive tract, development of the uterine glands postnatally, and the process of estrogen mediated cellular and molecular responses. Wnt5a is expressed throughout the endometrial stroma of the mammalian female reproductive tracts and is required in the development of the posterior formation of the Müllerian ducts (cervix, vagina). A Wnt5a absence study was performed by Mericskay et al. on mice and showed the anterior Müllerian-derived structures (oviducts and uterine horns) could easily be identified, and the posterior derived structures (cervix and vagina) were absent showing that this gene is a requirement for its development. Other members of the WNT family that are required for the development of the reproductive tract are Wnt4 and Wnt7a. Failure to develop reproductive tract will result in infertility. Not only is the WNT5A gene responsible for this formation but also is significate in the postnatal production of the uterine glands otherwise known as adenogenesis which is essential for adult function.  In addition to these two developments Wnt5a it needed for the complete process of estrogen mediated cellular and molecular responses.

Wnt ligands 

Wnt ligands are classically described as acting in an autocrine/paracrine manner. Wnts are also hydrophobic with significant post-translational palmitoylation and glycosylation. These post-translational modifications are important for docking to extracellular lipoprotein particles allowing them to travel systemically. Additionally, due to the high degree of sequence homology between Wnts many are characterized by their downstream actions.

Clinical significance

Cancer 

Wnt5a is implicated in many different types of cancers. However, no consistent correlation occurs between cancer aggressiveness and Wnt5a signaling up-regulation or down-regulation. The WNT5A gene has been shown to encode two distinct isoforms, each with unique functions in the context of cancer. The two isoforms are termed Wnt5a-long (Wnt5a-L) and Wnt5a-short (Wnt5a-S) because Wnt5a-L is 18 amino acids longer than Wnt5a-S. These 18 amino acids appear to have contrasting roles in cancer. Specifically, Wnt5a-L inhibits proliferation and Wnt5a-S increases proliferation. This may account for the discrepancies as to the role of Wnt5a in various cancers; however, the significance of these two isoforms is not completely clear. Elevated levels of beta-catenin in both primary and metastases of malignant melanoma have been correlated to improved survival and a decrease in cell markers of proliferation.

Cardiovascular Disease 
Increasing evidence has implicated Wnt5a in chronic inflammatory disorders. In particular Wnt5a has been implicated in atherosclerosis. It has been previously reported that there is an association between Wnt5a mRNA and protein expression and histopathological severity of human atherosclerotic lesions as well as co-expression of Wnt5a and TLR4 in foam cells/macrophages of murine and human atherosclerotic lesions. However, the role of Wnt proteins in the process and development of inflammation in atherosclerosis and other inflammatory conditions is not yet clear.

Therapeutics 
Some of the benefits of targeting this signaling pathway include:

• Many of the current DNA-targeting anticancer drugs carry the risk of giving rise to secondary tumors or additional primary cancers.

• Preferentially killing rapidly replicating malignant cells via cytotoxic agents cause serious side effects by injuring normal cells, particularly hematopoietic cells, intestinal cells, hair follicle and germ cells.

• Differentiated tumor cells in a state of quiescence are typically not affected by drugs can may account for tumor recurrence.

References

Further reading